The 1906 Currie Cup was the eighth edition of the Currie Cup, the premier domestic rugby union competition in South Africa.

See also

 Currie Cup

References

1906
1906 in South African rugby union
Currie